Adnan Chilwan is an Indian banking business executive, currently the Group CEO of Dubai Islamic Bank.

Career

Chilwan spent most of his early career in management positions at a wide range of Islamic and conventional banks in the Gulf region. Some of these banks include, HSBC, Dubai Bank, Abu Dhabi Islamic Bank, and Mashreq. He began work for Dubai Islamic Bank in 2008, first serving as the Chief of Retail Banking and later as the Deputy Chief Executive Officer. In 2010, he became a founding member of the board of directors for the Sharia-compliant Emirates Real Estate Investment Trust, a joint venture between Dubai Islamic Bank and Eiffel Management.

Chilwan was appointed as chief executive of  Dubai Islamic Bank in July 2013. Abdulla al Hamli, who had been the bank's CEO for five years, was appointed to the position of Managing Director. By November 2013, the bank's net profit was up 33.5% compared to the previous nine-month period. By 2014, the bank had 1.4 million customers and 86 branches across the UAE.

As GCEO, Chilwan indicated that his long-term goal is for the international operations of the bank to compose about 10 to 15% of the total revenue.  He helped develop the SME Business Solutions Initiative, a Sharia-compliant line of financial products and services for SMEs.

Recognition and awards
In 2014, Arabian Business named him to its list of the Gulf Cooperation Council's 100 Most Powerful Indians, and the Global Islamic Finance Awards awarded him the title of Islamic Banker of the Year. He was also  ranked 11th in Forbes Middle Easts 2014 list of the Top Indian Leaders in the Arab World.

In 2015, Chilwan was listed 4th on Trends Magazines and INSEAD Business School's annual ranking of the Top 100 CEOs in the Gulf Cooperation Council, based on the financial statements of publicly listed companies

References

External links
 Dubai Islamic Bank profile

Bank presidents and chief executive officers
Businesspeople of Indian descent
Businesspeople from Dubai
Emirati bankers
Emirati chief executives
Living people
Place of birth missing (living people)
Year of birth missing (living people)